Playa Espinar is a beach on the north-west coast of Puerto Rico, in the town of Aguada. The beach is 760 meters long.

See also 

 List of beaches in Puerto Rico

References

External links

Beaches of Puerto Rico
Aguada, Puerto Rico